Magdalena "Maggie" Leska (Leski) (born October 13, 1984 in Chicago) is a Polish-American figure skater who represented Poland. She is the 2005 Polish national silver medalist. She began skating at age five, and now coaches her own students in the United States.

Competitive highlights
JGP: ISU Junior Grand Prix

External links
 
 Skate Chicago

1984 births
Living people
Polish female single skaters
Polish emigrants to the United States
Figure skaters from Chicago
American sportswomen
21st-century American women